Tourism in South Korea refers to the tourist industry in the Republic of Korea. In 2012, 11.1 million foreign tourists visited South Korea, making it the 20th most visited country in the world, and the 5th most visited in Asia.  Most non-Korean tourists come from other parts of East Asia such as Japan, China, Taiwan, and Hong Kong. The recent popularity of Korean popular culture, often known as the "Korean Wave", in these countries has increased tourist arrivals. Seoul is the principal tourist destination for visitors; popular tourist destinations outside of Seoul include the major coastal city of Busan, the Seorak-san national park, the historic city of Gyeongju and subtropical Jeju Island. Traveling to North Korea is not normally possible without a special permission.

Korean tourism industry
The majority of the South Korean tourist industry is supported by domestic tourism. Thanks to the country's extensive network of trains and buses, most of the country lies within a day's round trip of any major city.
International tourists come primarily from nearby countries in Asia.  Japan, China, Hong Kong and Taiwan together account for roughly 75% of the total number of international tourists. In addition, the Korean Wave has brought increasing numbers of tourists from Southeast Asia and India. The Korea Tourism Organization (KTO) is targeting 100,000 arrivals from India in 2013.

Travel destinations of Korean tourists 
The number of Korean domestic tourists has increased since 2010. The number of people who participated in domestic travel (which includes one-day trips) was about 238.3 million (in 2015). It increased by 4.9% compared to 2014 (227.1 million). In 2014, Korean's domestic tourism expenditure was ₩14.4 trillion.

Also, Korean oversea tourists keep increasing since 2010. From 2012 to 2014, the number of people travelling overseas has risen by about 8.2% on average. In 2014, number of Korean oversea tourists was about 16.1 million. And Korean oversea tourism expenditure was $19,469.9 million.

History 
In the past, South Koreans were not likely to travel overseas, due to the Korean War and subsequent economic difficulties, as well as government restrictions on overseas travel, with passports issued only for a narrow range of reasons, such as traveling abroad on government businesses, for technical training, and so on. Since the 1960s, overseas travel restrictions and regulations have been continuously reviewed to prevent foreign currency waste from traveling abroad. However, during the 1980s, the liberalization of international travel has begun to take place in catering to the globalization of the South Korea society. Since then, South Koreans have been able to travel freely abroad.

The busy lifestyle of modern South Koreans, leading to difficulties in mediating vacations with family or friends, and the increase in one-person households, have contributed to the growing number of South Koreans traveling alone. Therefore, the popularity of destinations close to South Korea, where South Koreans can go for short vacations alone, are increasing. According to the results of a plane ticket analysis in 2016, the top foreign destination for South Koreans is Osaka, followed by Bangkok and Tokyo. Moreover, Osaka, Tokyo, and Shanghai have high re-visit rates for South Koreans. However European destinations such as London, Paris, and Rome have fallen in re-visit rating, due to geographical distances, expensive air fares and high costs.

International tourists typically enter the country through Incheon International Airport, near Seoul, which was found to be the world's best airport in 2006. Also international airports in Busan and Jeju are frequently used.

Statistics
In 2013, travel and tourism (domestic and international) directly contributed KRW26.7 trillion to South Korean GDP and directly supported 617,500 jobs in the country.

In 2018, travel and tourism based on international expenditure directly contributed KRW 16.7 trillion to the  South Korean GDP and directly supported 1.4 million jobs, this represented 5.3% of the total employment in the country (OECD). 

In 2019, the contribution of travel and tourism to the Korean GDP was up 4.2% of the total economy (KRW 81.4 billion). Which accounted for 4.8% of total employment (1.3%). The impact of international visitors accounted for KRW 26.5 billion (World Travel and Tourism Council).

Spending habits include
Leisure spending 82% vs. Business spending 18%
Domestic spending 55% vs. International spending 45%

According to the numbers in the graph, leisure spending is 64% higher than business spending while domestic spending is only 10% higher than international spending.

Arrival
Visitors arriving to South Korea for tourism by nationality:

China

China has been South Korea's largest tourism source for years. In 2016, visitors from China made up 46.8% of tourists in South Korea. However China imposed the group tour ban after the US military started to deploy the Terminal High Altitude Area Defense (THAAD) system in South Korea. From April 2017, Chinese tourists plummeted by more than 60% compared to the previous year. In recent years, the South Korean tourism industry has made it a long term goal to reduce dependency on Chinese tourists.

Japan

Since Lee Myung-bak's visit to the Liancourt Rocks and his demand for an apology from the Emperor of Japan over Japanese colonialism in Korea in 2012, the Japanese public's image of South Korea deteriorated significantly. Japanese tourists to South Korea declined by half from 3.5 million in 2012 to 1.8 million in 2015, while South Korean tourists to Japan doubled from 2 million in 2012 to 4 million in 2015.

Domestic tourist

Destination in Korea

Departure

Tourist attractions
South Korea's historical tourist attractions include the ancient capitals of Seoul, Gyeongju and Buyeo.

Some natural landmarks include the peaks of the Baekdudaegan, particularly  Seorak-san  and Jiri-san, the caves of Danyang and Hwanseongul, and beaches such as Haeundae and Mallipo.

Apart from Jeju island, there are many smaller islands. Excursion ferries are quite common along the south and west coasts and also to Ulleung-do Island, off the east coast. Limited tourism mainly by South Koreans to the Liancourt Rocks (Dokdo) has grown in recent years as a result of the political status of the rocks.

Many local districts hold annual festivals, such as the Boryeong Mud Festival and the Cheongdo Bullfighting Festival.

Major tourist destinations

Seoul 

The population of Seoul is 9,981,673 and it's the largest city in South Korea. As many people gather, there are many cultural spaces such as festivals, performances, shopping places, and tourist attractions in Seoul.

To foreigners, Seoul is an attractive place because traditional Korean culture and modern culture co-exists.

In addition, people in South Korea come to Seoul to enjoy various cultural activities. Due to the metropolitan area centralization of the cultural infrastructure, there is a cultural gap between Seoul and other regions. According to the Ministry of Culture, Sports and Tourism, 36.4 percent of the total cultural infrastructure such as public library, museum, and art galleries are concentrated in Seoul. Therefore, many people in South Korea travel to Seoul.
 Gyeongbokgung Palace
 Changdeokgung Palace
 Deoksugung Palace
 Gwanghwamun Square
 Fortress Wall of Seoul
 63 Building
 N Seoul Tower
 Bukchon Hanok Village
 War Memorial of Korea
 Jogyesa Temple
 National Museum of Korea
 Cheonggyecheon

Busan 
Busan is the second largest city in South Korea. It is located in the southeastern coast in Korea, so  Busan has abundant tourist attractions such as beach and hot spring.  People in South Korea visit beaches in Busan in hot summer. Also, there are various festivals in Busan. 11 festivals are held annually, including local festivals and art events. Busan sea festival is held every August and Busan International Film Festival is held every October. Jagalchi Cultural Festival is developed into a representative cultural tourism festival in Korea. Because of these various festivals and places, many people travel to Busan. Also, the influence of Social Network Service made Busan a popular tourist attraction. The official Facebook of the Busan Culture and Tourism Ministry and official blog sites promote the tourist attractions in Busan.
 Haeundae Beach
 Beomeosa Temple
 Haedong Yonggungsa Temple
 Geumjeongsanseong Fortress
 Dongnaeeupseong Fortress
 Dongnae-hyangyo Confucian Academy
 Chungnyeolsa Shrine
 Gukje Market

Daegu 
 Palgongsan Mountain
 Donghwasa Temple
 Cathedral of Our Lady of Lourdes in Daegu
 Dalseong Park
 Gyeongsang-gamyeong Park
 Old House of Lee Sang-hwa
 Daegu-hyanggyo Confucian Academy

Incheon 
 Songdo Central Park
 Jeondeungsa Temple
 Chamseongdan Altar
 Chinatown
 Wolmido Island
 Gwangseongbo Fortress

Gwangju 
 May 18th National Cemetery
 Mudeungsan National Park
 Gwangju Folk Museum
 Gwangju National Museum
 Jeungsimsa Temple

Daejeon 
 Hanbat Arboretum
 Yuseong Hot Springs
 Expo Park
 Daejeon Museum of Art

Gyeonggi Province 

 Suwon — Suwon Hwaseong Fortress
 Gwangju (Gyeonggi) — Namhansanseong Fortress
 Kuri — Donggureung Tomb Cluster
 Paju — DMZ, Panmunjeom
 Yongin — Everland, Korean Folk Village, Yongin Daejanggeum Park
 Gapyeong — The Garden of Morning Calm

Gangwon Province 

 Sokcho — Seoraksan, Ulsanbawi, Sinheungsa Temple
 Gangneung — Ojukheon, Seongyojang,  birthplace of Yul Gok, Gyeongpo Lake
 Pyeongchang — Woljeongsa, Odaesan, Daegwallyeong Stock Farm
 Donghae
 Yangyang — Naksansa Temple
 Samcheok — Samcheok Railbike, Hwanseong and Daegeum Caves, Haesindang Park, Samcheok Rose Park, Samcheok, Jeungsan, Yonghwa, Maengbang and Jangho Beaches
 Wonju — Gangwon Gamyeong, Guryongsa Temple, Park Kyung-ni Literature Park
 Jeongseon — Molundae
 Hongcheon — Suta Temple
 Goseong
 Yeongwol — Jangreung, Eorayeon, Gossigul, Kimsatgat Sites, Cheongryeongpo, Youngwol dahanu Village
Byeolmaro Observatory, Donggang Photo Museum, Bongraesan Mountain. Hanbando terrain in Soyanggang River
 Taebaek — Taebaek Mountain, Manggyeongsa Temple, Taebaek Mountains LIterature Park, Hwangji Pond
 Cheolwon — Cheorwon Peace Observatory, Memorial Tower of the Baekma Goji (Korean War)
 Hoengseong — Seong Sammum's Tomb, Noeundan, Baekyasa
 Inje —
 Yanggu —
 Hwacheon —

North Chungcheong Province 

 Boeun — Beopjusa Temple, Songnisan National Park, Samnyeonsanseong Fortress, Seon Byeong-guk House, Songnisan National Park
 Danyang — Guinsa Temple, Gosu Cave, Danyang Ondal Cave, Dodamsambong Peaks
 Cheongju — Cheongju National Museum, Cheongnamdae, Sangdangsanseong Fortress
 Jincheon — Bell Museum, Botapsa Temple

South Chungcheong Province 
 Gongju — Tomb of King Muryeong, Gongsanseong, Magoksa Temple, Donghaksa Temple, Gapsa Temple, Seonhwadang, Gongju National Museum
 Buyeo — Buyeo National Museum (Gilt-bronze Incense Burner of Baekje), Five storied stone pagoda of Jeongnimsa Temple site, Gungnamji, Nakhwa-am, Muryangsa Temple, Baekje Royal Tombs (Neungsan-ri Ancient Tombs)
 Cheonan — The independence hall of Korea, Gakwonsa Temple
 Seosan — Rock-carved triad buddha, Haemieupseong Fortress
 Nonsan — Mireuk-bosal at Gwanchoksa Temple

North Jeolla Province 

 Jeonju — Jeonju Hanok Village, Jeondong Catholic Church, Gyeonggijeon Shrine, Hanji Museum, Royal Portrait Museum, Jeonju Gaeksa, Jeonjuhyanggyo Confucian School
 Namwon — Gwanghallu Pavilion, Chunhyang Theme Park, Manin Cemetery of Righteous Fighters, Silsangsa Temple, Gyoryong Sanseong Fortress
 Gochang — Gochangeupseong Fortress, Seonunsa Temple, Pansori Museum
 Iksan — Mireuksaji Pagoda,
 Gimje — Geumsansa Temple
 Gunsan — Hirotsu House, Dongguksa Temple
 Buan — Tapsa Temple, Byeonsanbando National Park

South Jeolla Province 
 Yeosu — Jinnamgwan Hall, Hyangiram, Yi Sun Shin Square
 Suncheon — Songgwangsa Temple, Seonamsa Temple, Nagan Eupseong Folk Village
 Mokpo — Mokpo Modern History Museum, Gatbawi Rock, Yudal Mountain
 Haenam — Ttangggut (End of the Land) Village, Mihwangsa Temple
 Gurye — Hwaeomsa Temple
 Damyang  — Damyang Juknokwon, Metasequoia-lined Road, Soswaewon Garden
 Boseong  — Boseong Green Tea Field Daehan Dawon
 Wando  — Cheongsan island (slow city)

North Gyeongsang Province 

 Gyeongju — Bulguksa Temple, Seokguram, Anapji Pond, Gyeongju National Museum, Cheonmachong Tomb, Cheomseongdae Observatory, Yangdong Folk Village, Bunhwangsaji (Bunhwangsa Temple Site)
 Andong — Hahoe Folk Village, Hahoe Mask Museum, Dosanseowon Confucian School, Byeongsanseowon Confucian School, Wollyeongo Bridge
 Yeongju — Buseoksa Temple
 Mungyeong — Mungyeong Saejae Provincial Park
 Ulleung — Dokdo Island

South Gyeongsang Province 
 Yangsan — Tongdosa Temple
 Hapcheon — Haeinsa Temple
 Tongyeong — Dongpirang Wall Painting Village
 Jinju — Jinjuseong, National Jinju Museum
 Geoje — Historic Park of Geoje POW Camp, Sinseondae
 Namhae — Gacheon Daerangi Village, German Village
 Gimhae — Tomb of King Suro, Tomb of Queen Heo Hwang-ok
 Changnyeong — Upo Wetland
 Miryang — Yeongnamnu, Pyochungsa, Eoreumgol Valley

Jeju Special Self-governing Province 

 Mount Halla
 Cheonjeyeon and Cheonjiyeon waterfalls
 Hallim Park
 Yakcheonsa Temple
 Manjanggul
 Jeju Stone Statue Park

Events
South Korea has hosted many international events, including the 1988 Summer Olympics, the 1993 Taejon Expo, the 2002 FIFA World Cup (jointly hosted with Japan), the 2005 APEC conference, the 2010 G-20 Seoul summit, the 2014 Asian Games, and the 2018 Winter Olympics.

See also
 Visa policy of South Korea
 KTO (Korea Tourism Organization)
 Tourism in North Korea
 Tourism in Gyeongju
 List of South Korean tourist attractions

References
0. For entering South Korea, individuals must apply ETA “K-ETA” for visiting visa free program for tourists.

Further reading

External links

 
 , the Korea Tourism Organization’s London office website for info on travelling from the UK to Korea 
 Tour2Korea, the Korea Tourism Organization’s website 
 Ministry of Culture and Tourism 
 , Park Air Travel Ltd  Specialists in Travel to Korea – London office website 

 
South Korea